Sir Robert Clough (10 February 1873 – 27 September 1965) was Coalition Conservative MP for Keighley. He won it from the Liberals in 1918, but stood down in 1922. He later stood in the 1930 Shipley by-election.

Sources
Whitaker's Almanack, 1919 to 1922 editions
F W S Craig, British Parliamentary Election Results, 1918–1949; Political Reference Publications, Glasgow, 1949 p. 517

Conservative Party (UK) MPs for English constituencies
Politicians from Yorkshire
Knights Bachelor
1873 births
1965 deaths
20th-century British businesspeople